Dunia Baru The Movie is a Malaysian film based on the comedy drama series "Dunia Baru". The film released on 7 February 2008.

Synopsis
The movie begins when Opie finds a letter from Anizah saying that she wants to marry her boyfriend, Fazley, and has buried her dreams to continue her studies in the UK. Opie, Suzanna Adif and Tajol rush to stop her, and the movie chronicles their misadventures.

Cast
Pierre Andre as Adif
Erneelya Elyana as Opie
Anita Baharom as Anizah
Ellyas Abdullah as Tajul
Baizura Kahar as Erika
Ngasriah Ngasri as Madihah
Iqram Dinzly as Darius
Almy Nadia as Suzanna
Mohd Hafiz Nafiah as Fazley
Hok Aloh as Ek Eleh
Khirul Anwar as NUO

2008 films
Malaysian comedy-drama films
2008 comedy-drama films
Malay-language films
Grand Brilliance films